Serdobsk is a town and the administrative center of Serdobsky District in Penza Oblast, Russia. Population:

Geography 

Climate 
The climate is moderately continental. The winter in Serdobsk is moderately cold and long lasting from the beginning of November to the end of March. The coldest month is February with an average temperature of -9.1 °C. Summer is warm, lasting from late May to early September; the average July temperature is 20.4 °C. The average annual temperature is 5.5 °C. The climate is similar to Moscow, but the continentality is higher and the precipitation lower.

History

Founded by Alexander Aleksandrovich of Penza in 1698, it has been known since 1699 as Serdobinskaya sloboda. Since the mid-18th century, it had been called Bolshaya Serdoba. It was granted town status on 7 November 1780 by Catherine II.

In 1865 a wooden church and cemetery was built in the name of St. Nicholas.

Administrative and municipal status
Within the framework of administrative divisions, Serdobsk serves as the administrative center of Serdobsky District. As an administrative division, it is incorporated within Serdobsky District as the town of district significance of Serdobsk. As a municipal division, the town of district significance of Serdobsk is incorporated within Serdobsky Municipal District as Serdobsk Urban Settlement.

Notable residents
 Vsevolod Bazhenov (1909–1986), painter 
 Nikolai Ishutin (1840–1879), utopian socialist

References

Notes

Sources

External links
 History of Serdobsk Clock Factory, «Majak»

Cities and towns in Penza Oblast
Serdobsky Uyezd